Laxmichi Paule is a Marathi-language movie released on 18 February 1982. It was produced by Arun Pandit Chipade and directed by G.G. Bhosle.

Cast 

The cast includes Ranjana, Ravindra Mahajani, Suhasini Deshpande, Nilu Phule, Sulochana, Balchandra Kulkarni, and others.

Soundtrack
The music is provided by Sridhar Phadke.

Track listing

References

External links 
 Laxmichi Paule at Gomolo 

1982 films
1980s Marathi-language films